Hamad Al-Sayyaf (born 18 January 2002) is a Saudi Arabian professional footballer who plays as a defender for Al-Ettifaq.

Career
Al-Sayyaf started his career at the youth team of Al-Ettifaq and represented the club at every level. On 11 October 2020, he signed his first professional contract with Al-Ettifaq. He made his first-team debut on 12 December 2020 in the league match against Damac. On 28 January 2022, Al-Sayyaf joined Al-Sahel on loan.

Honours

International
Saudi Arabia U23
WAFF U-23 Championship: 2022

References

External links
 

2002 births
Living people
Saudi Arabian footballers
Saudi Arabia youth international footballers
Association football defenders
Ettifaq FC players
Al-Sahel SC (Saudi Arabia) players
Saudi Professional League players
Saudi First Division League players